The Trouble with Me may refer to:

 "The Trouble with Me", a 2005 song by Robbie Williams from Intensive Care
 "The Trouble with Me", a 2003 song by Skin from Fleshwounds